Daren Dwayne Brown (born June 13, 1967) is an American professional baseball manager, who spent much of the 2013 season as the third base coach of the Seattle Mariners of Major League Baseball (MLB).

The son of big leaguer Paul Brown and nephew of Jackie Brown, Daren Brown was a pitcher in the Toronto Blue Jays minor league system from 1989 to 1993, and with the Amarillo Dillas of the independent Texas–Louisiana League from 1994 to 1999. He worked as a player-coach and player-manager during his time with the Dillas. Since 2000, Brown has been a manager in the Mariners minor league system, and managed the Tacoma Rainiers since 2007 except for a brief stint as interim manager of the Mariners during the 2010 season, along with serving as interim third-base coach of the Mariners in 2013 after Jeff Datz announced that he was diagnosed with cancer.

Professional career

Playing career
Brown pitched for Southeastern Oklahoma State University wrapping up his playing career with the Savages in 1989.

The son of big leaguer Paul Brown and nephew of Jackie Brown, Brown was drafted as a pitcher in the 29th round of the 1989 amateur draft by the Toronto Blue Jays and pitched in their chain for four years. From 1995 to 1999 he pitched for  the independent league Amarillo Dillas. He was the Texas–Louisiana League Pitcher of the Year in 1995, 1997, and 1998, and made the league's all-star team from 1995 to 1998.

Coaching career
During Brown's time in Amarillo he also served as the team's pitching coach from 1994 to 1997 and was the club's manager from 1998 to 2000, compiling a 203–77 (.725) record which included winning the Texas–Louisiana League Championship in 1999. He was named the Texas–Louisiana League Manager of the Year in 1999.

Since 2001, Brown has worked in the Seattle Mariners organization. His first job with the Mariners was manager of the club's single-A affiliate, the San Bernardino Stampede. He helped San Bernardino reach the postseason in 2001 with a 43–27 second-half record, tops in the South Division, but fell in the first round of the playoffs. Brown led club to 77–63 overall record in 2002 and first-place finish in the first half of the season. In 2003 Brown led the Mariners' Class A affiliate, the Wisconsin Timber Rattlers to a 69–66 record in 2003. Wisconsin earned a playoff berth with a 38–28 first half and finished second in the division. The Timber Rattlers lost in the first round of the post-season. He spent 2004–2005 as manager of the Inland Empire 66ers. Led them to a 77–63 record and was the only team in Mariners organization to play in the postseason in 2004. In 2006 Brown managed the San Antonio Missions.

Since 2007, Brown has managed the Seattle Mariners Triple-A club, the Tacoma Rainiers. The Holdenville, Oklahoma native became the all-time leader in managerial wins in Tacoma franchise history last season when he notched his 376th victory with the Rainiers on May 28 vs. Tucson. He led the Rainiers to back-to-back divisional titles in 2009 and 2010, including winning the PCL Championship in 2010.

Brown was named the interim manager of the Seattle Mariners on August 9, 2010, after the team fired manager Don Wakamatsu, and by bringing in many players from Tacoma achieved a remarkable initial turnaround. In May 2013, Brown rejoined the Mariners wearing uniform (#52) as extra coach and to fill in as a third base coach when needed while Jeff Datz underwent cancer treatment.

Brown returned to Tacoma for the 2019 season, after serving in other capacities  within Seattle's farm system. After managing the 2019 Rainiers to 61 wins, he is the all-time winningest manager in team history.

Managerial record

Personal
The name of Brown's wife is Cindy, and the couple have a home in Amarillo, Texas.

References

External links

Daren Brown at MiLB.com

1967 births
Living people
People from Holdenville, Oklahoma
Seattle Mariners managers
St. Catharines Blue Jays players
Myrtle Beach Blue Jays players
Dunedin Blue Jays players
Knoxville Blue Jays players
Knoxville Smokies players
Amarillo Dillas players
San Antonio Missions managers
Southeastern Oklahoma State Savage Storm baseball players
Seattle Mariners coaches